The Army of the Trans-Mississippi was a major Confederate army under the Department of the Trans-Mississippi during the American Civil War. It was the last major Confederate command to surrender, submitting on May 26, 1865, exactly one month after General Johnston had surrendered in the eastern United States.

Background 
The Department of the Trans-Mississippi separated from the Western Department of the Confederacy on May 26, 1862. It consisted primarily of the three Confederate states west of the Mississippi (Texas, Louisiana, and Arkansas), the contested state of Missouri, and two Confederate territories - the Indian Territory and Confederate Arizona (roughly corresponding to the present-day states of Oklahoma, New Mexico, and Arizona). The command of the area was given to Major-General T. H. Holmes. The Trans-Mississippi was the operational theater for many quasi-independent forces, including Quantrill's Raiders and the Missouri Bushwhackers.

History 
The Army of the Trans-Mississippi originally numbered well over 50,000 troops, but fewer than 43,000 were available by the end of the war. Major campaigns included Sibley's New Mexico campaign, Banks' Red River campaign, and Price's Missouri campaign. The last battle of the Civil War, the Battle of Palmito Ranch, was fought May 12–13, 1865, by units of the Army of the Trans-Mississippi.

General E. Kirby Smith, who commanded the Army, surrendered to Union forces on May 26, 1865, although by that point many of his troops had already deserted. The last remaining Army of the Trans-Mississippi force – and also the last remaining Confederate force – was the 1st Cherokee Mounted Rifles, commanded by Brigadier-General Stand Watie. Watie surrendered on June 23.

Organization 
Trans-Mississippi Army, I Corps (Headquartered at Shreveport, Department of Louisiana)
This corps was organized under the command of Simon Bolivar Buckner

Trans-Mississippi Army, II Corps (Department of Arkansas and Missouri)
This corps was organized on August 4, 1864, under the command of John B. Magruder.

Trans-Mississippi Army, III Corps (Headquartered at Galveston, Department of Texas)
This corps was organized on August 4, 1864, under the command of John George Walker.

Trans-Mississippi Army, Cavalry Corps
The Cavalry Corps was organized on August 4, 1864, under the command of Sterling Price.

Trans-Mississippi Army, Reserve Corps
The Reserve Corps was established on September 10, 1864, to support the Trans-Mississippi Army.

References

1862 establishments in Arkansas
1865 disestablishments in Louisiana
Trans-Mississippi
Military units and formations established in 1862
Military units and formations disestablished in 1865
Trans-Mississippi Theater of the American Civil War